Brahim Najmeddine is a Moroccan professional footballer who plays as a defender.

References

1993 births
Living people
Moroccan footballers
Association football defenders
Kawkab Marrakech players
Wydad AC players
Difaâ Hassani El Jadidi players